William G. Kaufmann (December 10, 1869 – January 16, 1947) was an American businessman and politician.

Born in Sheboygan, Wisconsin, Kaufmann was in the meat retail business until retirement. He also worked in a logging camp and owned a fishing tug. Kaufmann served on the Sheboygan Fire and Police Commission and the Welfare Bureau. Kaufmann served in the Wisconsin State Assembly in 1921 and was a Republican. Kaufmann died in Sheboygan, Wisconsin.

Notes

1869 births
1947 deaths
Politicians from Sheboygan, Wisconsin
Businesspeople from Wisconsin
Republican Party members of the Wisconsin State Assembly